The 1958 6 Hour Production Car Race was an endurance motor race staged on 2 June 1958 at the Caversham Circuit, in Western Australia. It was open to production cars competing in "Sports Car" and "Sedan Car" classes. The race, which was the fourth in a sequence of annual "Six Hour Le Mans" races to be held in Western Australia between 1955 and 1972 was won by Jim Harwood and Bill Downey driving a Triumph TR2.

Results

Notes
 Attendance: 10,000

References

Further reading
 Jim Shepherd, A History of Australian Motor Sport, 1980, pages 150-151

External links
 Life's a Hoot: The Autobiography of James Harwood, (pages 39 to 41), books.google.com.au

Six Hours Le Mans
6 Hour Production Car Race
June 1958 sports events in Australia